The 1966–67 Greenlandic Football Championship was the 5th edition of the Greenlandic Men's Football Championship. The final round was held in Nuuk. It was the second football championship won by Kissaviarsuk-33.

Qualifying stage

Disko Bay

Central Greenland

Siumut Amerdlok Kunuk qualified for the final Round.

South Greenland

NB Some match results are unavailable.

Final round

See also
Football in Greenland
Football Association of Greenland
Greenland national football team
Greenlandic Football Championship

References

Greenlandic Men's Football Championship seasons
Green
Foo
Foo